Border Vengeance is a 1935 American Western B movie directed by Ray Heinz, written by Forbes Parkhill based upon the novel The Return of the Muley Kid by R. Craig Christensen. The film had its premiere on June 1, 1935 and was released to theaters on June 5.

Background
The project starred former football player Lafayette H. "Reb" Russell, and was filmed in 1934 by Willis Kent, an independent filmmaker known for his low budget exploitation melodramas.

Plot 
A rancher is murdered by Flash Purdue (Kenneth MacDonald) after he catches Flash in the act of rustling his cattle. Flash diverts attention from himself by accusing the nearby Benson ranch of being the ones who perpetrated the deed. When his family is accused, Peeler Benson (Reb Russell) shoots at Flash and hits his ear. As a mob grows, he is able to get to his family in time to warn them so that they are able to escape across the border to safety. Hoping to clear his family's name, Peeler decides to stay behind, and joins a traveling rodeo circuit under the name The Muley Kid. Five years later he returns to town and is captured by Flash, who intends kill him out of vengeance for the injury to his ear.

Cast 
 Reb Russell as Peeler Benson, aka The Muley Kid
 Kenneth MacDonald as Flash Purdue
 Clarence Geldart as Sam Griswold
 Pat Harmon as Tex Pryor
 Ben Corbett as Bud Benson
 Slim Whitaker as Posse Leader
 Mary Jane Carey as Sally Griswold
 Norman Feusier as Old Man Benson
 Marty Joyce as Young Benson
 June Brewster as June Griswold
 Hank Bell as Sheriff
 Rex Bell as Rodeo Guest Star
 Glenn Strange as Cowhand

Critical reception
According to Hans J. Wollstein of Rovi, even as "bottom-of-the-barrel filmmaking on all fronts", the film did have good points. The climatic finale of a nighttime shootout was "quite effective", and with "blood oozing", it was one of the few films of its genre to show the effects of a bullet on its victim. However, the padding out of the film by its inclusion of rodeo footage of former Western hero Rex Bell and horse stunt and trick rider Montie Montana "manages to drag out the 58 minutes of running time almost beyond human endurance".

References

External links 

1935 films
American black-and-white films
1935 Western (genre) films
American independent films
Films based on American novels
Films based on Western (genre) novels
American Western (genre) films
1930s independent films
Films directed by Ray Heinz
1930s English-language films
1930s American films